Fritz Hermann Michael Bayerlein (14 January 1899 – 30 January 1970) was a general in the Wehrmacht of Nazi Germany during World War II. He initially served as a staff officer, including with Erwin Rommel in the Afrika Korps. He then commanded the 3rd Panzer Division, the Panzer Lehr Division and LIII Army Corps in the European theatre. Bayerlein was a recipient of the Knight's Cross of the Iron Cross with Oak Leaves and Swords.

World War II

Bayerlein served as a staff officer of General Heinz Guderian for the invasion of Poland and the Battle of France. In Operation Barbarossa, the invasion of the Soviet Union, during June 1941, Bayerlein was assigned to Guderian's Panzer Group 2 staff. After the Battle of Kiev, Bayerlein was transferred to Generaloberst Erwin Rommel's staff. Bayerlein was moved to the Führerreserve in August 1942, then reassigned to the Afrika Korps as Chief of Staff.

He served as a staff officer under the command of Generalmajor Walter Nehring beginning in March 1942 upon Nehring's transfer to Africa. Later, he served under Erwin Rommel and Wilhelm von Thoma. When Rommel left Tunisia in March 1943 after the failed attack during the Battle of Medenine (Operation Capri), Bayerlein was appointed German liaison officer under the new commander, Italian Giovanni Messe. He was sent to Italy before the German troops in Tunisia surrendered on 12 May 1943. Bayerlein was sent to the Eastern Front in October 1943, to lead the 3rd Panzer Division, which was surrounded at Kirovograd. Bayerlein led a breakout through the Soviet encirclement.

He was reassigned to command the Panzer Lehr Division, which moved to Normandy on 7 June. During the Allied Operation Cobra, Allied bombing near Saint-Lô decimated the division. The remnants of the Panzer Lehr Division slipped out of the Falaise pocket and moved east toward Vire in August 1944. The division next took part in the Ardennes Offensive, in December 1944, as part of the XLVII Panzer Corps; Bayerlein was relieved of command following the failed offensive. He took command of the LIII Army Corps in February 1945 and surrendered to the U.S. Army in the Ruhr Pocket on 19 April 1945.

After the war
Bayerlein was a prisoner of war from April 1945 through April 1947. During this time, he and many other generals in Allied captivity wrote the European battle histories for the U.S. Army Historical Division. Bayerlein was released in 1947. He wrote about military subjects and continued his work for the Historical Division. He died in 1970. Bayerlein is credited as a technical advisor for the 1961 film, The Guns of Navarone.

Awards
 Iron Cross (1914) 2nd Class (30 August 1918) & 2nd Class (13 September 1939)
 Iron Cross (1939) 1st Class (27 September 1939)
 German Cross in Gold on 23 October 1942 as Oberst in the General Staff in the Deutsches Afrika-Korps
 Knight's Cross of the Iron Cross with Oak Leaves and Swords
 Knight's Cross on 26 December 1941 as Oberstleutnant in the General Staff and Chief of the General Staff of the DAK
 258th Oak Leaves on 6 July 1943 as Generalmajor and German Chief of Staff of the 1st Italian Army
 81st Swords on 20 July 1944 as Generalleutnant and commander of the Panzer-Lehr-Division

References

Citations

Bibliography

External links

1899 births
1970 deaths
Lieutenant generals of the German Army (Wehrmacht)
Recipients of the Knight's Cross of the Iron Cross with Oak Leaves and Swords
Military personnel from Würzburg
Recipients of the Gold German Cross
German Army personnel of World War I
Reichswehr personnel
Knights of the Military Order of Savoy
Recipients of the Silver Medal of Military Valor